This page shows the progress of Macclesfield Town F.C. in the 2011–12 English football season. This year they play their games in League Two in the English league system, the fourth tier.

League data

League table

Results summary

Managerial change

Following Macclesfield's victory over Port Vale on 31 December 2011, the club then went 16 consecutive games without a victory and found themselves out of the relegation places in League Two only by way of goal difference. This prompted chairman Mike Rance to sack Gary Simpson on 18 March 2012. Brian Horton was installed as manager until the end of the season, in what is his second spell at the club, a day later.

Squad statistics

Appearances and goals

|-
|colspan="14"|Players who no longer play for Macclesfield but have made appearances this season:

|-
|colspan="14"|Players on loan to Macclesfield who returned to their parent club:

|}

Top scorers

Disciplinary record

Results

Pre-season friendlies

League Two

FA Cup

League Cup

Football League Trophy

Transfers

Awards

References

Macclesfield Town F.C. seasons
Macclesfield Town